Mahmoud Benhalib (born 23 March 1996) is a Moroccan professional footballer who plays as a forward for  Al-Ahly SC (Benghazi).

Club career
Benhalib started his career in Raja Casablanca and made his senior debut in 2015 since then he has scored 25 goals in 38 senior team appearances. He was the winner of the most promising talent award issued by the Union Marocaine des Footballeurs Professionnels, in partnership with the Royal Moroccan Football Federation for the 2017–18 Botola season.

In the 2017–18 CAF Confederation, he finished as the top scorer with 9 goals.

Honours 
Raja Casablanca
Botola: 2020
CAF Super Cup: 2019
Moroccan Throne Cup: 2017
CAF Confederation Cup: 2018, 2021

Individual
Botola Best Promising Player of the Season: 2017–18.
CAF Confederation Cup Top Scorer: 2018 (12 goals).

References

1996 births
Living people
People from Casablanca
Moroccan footballers
Association football forwards
Raja CA players